Visitors to Chad must obtain a visa from one of the Chadian diplomatic missions unless they come from one of the visa exempt countries.


Visa policy map

Visa exemption 
Citizens of the following 15 countries can visit Chad without a visa for up to 90 days:

ID — may enter using ID card

Holders of diplomatic passports issued to nationals of Benin, Comoros, Djibouti, Egypt, Eritrea, Gambia, Ghana, Guinea, Guinea-Bissau, Kenya, Liberia, Libya, Mali, Morocco, Sao Tome and Principe, Sierra Leone, Somalia, Sudan, Tunisia and Turkey do not require a visa for Chad.

Visa on arrival 
Passengers with an Entry Authorisation letter issued by the authorities of Chad before departure can obtain a visa on arrival.

Citizens of  can obtain visa on arrival without Entry Authorisation.

eVisa
In August 2019 Chad announced a plan to introduce eVisas. The Government plans to launch the system in September 2019.

Transit 
Transit without visa is allowed for travelers continuing their trip within 48 hours by the same or first connecting plane to a third country without leaving the airport.

Police Registration 
Mandatory police registration is required for all nationalities within 72 hours of arrival.

See also

 Visa requirements for Chadian citizens

References 

Chad
Foreign relations of Chad